Carlos Ribas (born 7 June 1973) is a Brazilian equestrian. He competed in the individual jumping event at the 2012 Summer Olympics.

References

1973 births
Living people
Brazilian male equestrians
Olympic equestrians of Brazil
Equestrians at the 2012 Summer Olympics
Sportspeople from São Paulo